Kaufhold is a surname of German origin. Notable people with the surname include:

Casey Kaufhold (born 2004), American archer
Gerhard Kaufhold (1928–2009), German footballer
Hubert Kaufhold (born 1943), German judge
Karl Heinrich Kaufhold (1932–2020), German economic historian
Otmar Kaufhold (1952–2001), German rower

German-language surnames